Veridiana (Virginia Margaret del Mazziere) (1182 – 1 February 1242) is an Italian saint.

Born at Castelfiorentino, Tuscany, of a noble family, somewhat impoverished but still prestigious, Verdiana was noted from an early age for her generosity and sense of charity.  She made a pilgrimage to Santiago de Compostela.  Upon returning to Castelfiorentino and feeling a desire for solitude and penance, she had herself walled up as an anchorite in a little cell contiguous to the oratory of San Antonio.  She remained secluded there for 34 years under the obedience of a Vallumbrosan abbey (however, the Franciscans claim her as one of their tertiaries).

Like many recluses of her era, it is not certain whether Verdiana belonged to any particular monastic order.  The Dominican order appropriated her after her death through the redaction of her vita, but probably belonged to none of the mendicant orders during her lifetime.  One late account suggests that in 1221 she was visited by Francis of Assisi, who admitted her into his Third Order.  It is more likely that she was associated with the local monastery in Castelfiorentino, which belonged to the Vallombrosan order, the economic success of which had so worried the bishops of Florence.  Even this affiliation, however, most likely occurred after her death, as various monastic orders vied for “possession” of yet another popular saint.
 
From a little window she spoke to visitors and received an insufficient amount of food.  Tradition holds that two snakes penetrated her cell in the last years of her life.  These increased her mortification of the flesh, but she never revealed their existence.  Another local tradition holds that upon her death, the bells of Castelfiorentino began to ring unaided by any human hand, unexpectedly and simultaneously.
  
She was canonized by Pope Clement VII in 1533. Her feast day is 1 February.

Vitae 
Knowledge of Verdiana and her life comes from two hagiographies, one from the fourteenth century and the other from the fifteenth.  The first was redacted around 1340 and attributed to Biagio, a monk and perhaps abbot of the Vallombrosan convent of Santa Trinità in Florence during the first half of the fourteenth century.   Very little else is known about him other than the fact that around 1340 he collected and assembled from preexisting materials a compendium of the lives of saints venerated in Florence and Tuscany, now contained in the Biblioteca Medicea Laurenziana.   Verdiana’s second hagiographer, Lorenzo Giacomini, was a native of Castelfiorentino born circa 1369.  He entered into the Dominican order in Florence in 1383, and after acting as a lettore for many years in various convents, including those of the Roman and Lombard provinces, he was made bishop of Acaia in 1413 by Pope John XXII.   It is thought to be shortly after this time, around 1420, that he wrote a new vita in deference to his native city and to his particular devotion to Verdiana.   His account borrowed faithfully from Biagio, though Giacomini sought to enrich it with miracles and information on the cult and translations of Verdiana known from contemporary traditions and his own experience.   It is this version, erroneously attributed to Bishop Attone of Pistoia, that appears in the Acta Sanctorum.   Because of the two vitae, it is possible for scholars to compare Verdiana’s hagiographically “typical” life in Biagio’s earlier vita and the greater emphasis on Verdiana’s connection to the community of Castelfiorentino in Lorenzo Giacomini’s.

See also
Viridiana (name)

Notes

References 
Biagio.  Biblioteca Medicea Laurenziana. Plut. 20.6, 41v-44r. “Vita sanctae viridianae” (c. 1340)
Giacomini, Lorenzo. Acta Sanctorum.  Feb. I, pp. 257–61. “Verdiana.” (c. 1420)
Benvenuti, Anna. “Capi d’aglio e serpenti: Aspetti civici del culto di santa Verdiana di Castelfiorentino,” La Toscane et les Toscans autour de la Renaissance: cadres de vie, société, croyances: mélanges offerts à Charles-M. de La Roncière.  Aix-en-Provence: Publications de l'Université de Provence, 1999.  pp. 313–349.
Benvenuti, Anna.  “Mendicant Friars and Female Pinzochere in Tuscany: From Social Marginality to Models of Sanctity.”  Women and Religion in Medieval and Renaissance Italy.  Ed. Daniel Bornstein and Roberto Rusconi.  Trans. Margery J. Schneider.  Chicago: University of Chicago Press, 1996. pp. 84–103.
Del Re, Niccolò. “Verdiana.” Bibliotheca sanctorum. 12 vols., Rome: 1961-9., XIII, col. 1023-1027.
Improta, Maria Cristina. La Chiesa di Santa Verdiana a Castelfiorentino. Castelfiorentino: Comune di Castelfiorentino, 1986.
Wieben, Corinne. "Foster-Mother of Vipers: Episcopal Conflict and the Cult of Verdiana da Castelfiorentino." Languages of Power in Italy (1300–1600). Ed. Daniel Bornstein, Laura Gaffuri, and Brian J. Maxson. Turnhout, Belgium: Brepols, 2017. pp. 143–160.

External links 
Saints Index: Verdiana
 Verdiana
 Santa Verdiana
 La Santa sotto chiave

1182 births
1242 deaths
People from Castelfiorentino
Italian saints
13th-century Christian saints
13th-century Italian women